Pisidium pulchellum , the iridescent pea mussel, is a minute species of pea clam, a freshwater bivalve in the family Sphaeriidae.

Description

The 3.5–4 mm shell is tumid (swollen), oblique-oval shell. The umbos are broad well and well behind the midpoint. The surface (periostracum) is glossy with regular concentric ribbing. The colour is grey to cream tinged and pinkvor orange from the animal inside.

Distribution and conservation status
 Not listed in IUCN red list – not evaluated (NE)
 Germany – critically endangered (vom Aussterben bedroht) 
 Nordic countries: Denmark, Finland, Iceland, Norway and Sweden (not in Faroes)
Great Britain and Ireland

References

External links
Pisidium pulchellum at Animalbase taxonomy,short description, biology,status (threats), images

pulchellum
Bivalves described in 1832